Chiral Photonics, Inc. is a photonics company based in Pine Brook, New Jersey, founded in 1999. The company is developing a new class of optical devices based on twisting glass optical fibers. These in-fiber devices aim to displace discrete optical elements such as lasers, filters and sensors. They benefit from optical fiber’s transmission efficiency, robustness and ease of integration.

The company hopes that its manufacturing process, which is completely automated and  scalable, will result, for example, in communications lasers that are fraction of the cost and three times more efficient than today’s semiconductor lasers.  Chiral Photonics is also developing chirality in polymeric thin films which, for instance, would enable high quality projection displays.

Funding
Chiral Photonics had received funding from venture capital, angel, and government sources including a US$2 million National Institute of Standards and Technology Advanced Technology Program award in 2004.

Technology
Chiral Photonics’ technology is an outgrowth of the 1997 discovery by two of the company's co-founders, Azriel Genack and Victor Kopp, that lasing in cholesteric liquid crystal (CLC) films is a result of their unique self-assembling helical (chiral) microstructure.  CLCs are the thin-film material often used to fabricate fish tank thermometers or mood rings, that change color with temperature changes. They change color because their molecules are arranged in a helical or chiral arrangement and with temperature the pitch of that helical structure changes, reflecting different wavelengths of light.

Drs. Genack and Kopp decided to pursue the possibility that CLCs, with their natural chiral structure, could provide a platform for a versatile new class of photonic devices.  In biomimetic fashion, Chiral Photonics has abstracted the self-assembled structure of the organic CLCs to produce analogous optical devices using tiny lengths of inorganic, twisted fiber.  Designing novel microforming towers, the company is able to fabricate devices based on fibers that can be twisted through more than 25,000 revolutions over a one-inch length.

These revolutions function as would a fiber Bragg grating.  The density of twists per inch, or periodicity, demonstrably results in the light being coupled to the fiber cladding, scattered out of the fiber, or reflected back within the fiber. This interaction with light can be harnessed to produce sensors, polarizers/isolators, and filter/lasers, respectively.

Applications
These basic components can be used for a variety of applications and all share a common production platform. In his comments upon the grant’s award, William Sargeant, the National Science Foundation program officer who oversaw Chiral Photonics' first SBIR award, noted the range of existing and incipient markets.  "This technology could be one of the most significant recent advances in the field of polarization and wavelength control.  There is an enormous host of applications for which chiral fiber gratings could find markets."

Chiral Photonics’ components are all of the all-fiber variety.  Released products include linear and circular polarizers, ultra-high temperature sensors, customized harsh environment pressure, axial rotation, and liquid level sensors, and a spot size converting interconnect.

The spot size converter, while not of chiral geometry, leverages the company’s glass microfabrication knowhow. The spot size converter (SSC) couples light between widely disparate (NA and MFD) components, such as, between <25 micrometre planar waveguides or laser diodes, and standard 125 micrometre SMF fiber. The SSC allows for direct light coupling with no air gap, sub-0.5 dB loss, and extinction ratios of >20 dB for use in silicon photonics and other applications.

Chiral Photonics also offers twisted capillary tubes for proteomic analysis. The protein unfolds as it passes through the channel allowing for imaging. In other uses the rotation of the protein as it passes through the channel facilitates 360° imaging. The capillary tubes also have other microfluidic applications including mixing and uniform heat exchange.

Patents
Chiral Photonics has been issued 19 United States or International patents relating to its photonics research.

See also
 Bionics
 Fiber Bragg grating
 Long-period fiber grating

References

External links
Official website
NSF Animation

Photonics companies
Companies based in Morris County, New Jersey